Bowman Yachts is a brand of the British premium yachtbuilder Rustler Yachts, which is based in Falmouth, Cornwall. They are known for handbuilding traditionally styled glassfibre composite ocean-cruising yachts, with a high quality of workmanship.

Bowman existed as an independent company for many years, before merging with Rival Yachts to form Rival Bowman. The company went into receivership in November 2001, and was acquired by Rustler Yachts in 2002, which moved manufacturing to its yard in Falmouth. Rustler's own yachts, and those marketed under the Bowman brand, are produced in the same factory, built in 2005, as were the yachts of the Starlight brand, owned by Rival Bowman until 2011. Bowman hulls are available part-complete for fitting out by the owner, in addition to factory-completed boats.

Range
Bowman 42
Bowman 45
Bowman 48

See also
List of sailboat designers and manufacturers

References

British boat builders
Companies based in Cornwall
English brands
Yacht building companies
Falmouth, Cornwall